The Mundialito de Clubs, officially Cup Super Clubs or Coppa Supermondiale Clubs, was an unofficial summer association football friendly tournament that took place in Milan, Italy from 1981 to 1987 every two years, except for 1985 where he played in Cesena, organized by the TV Channel 5. The tournament was played in San Siro. The first two editions were named Coppa Super Clubs, and the last was the name of the Coppa delle Stelle. In 1987 Paris Saint-Germain F.C. replaced Olympique de Marseille, F.C. Porto replaced FC Dynamo Kyiv and F.C. Barcelona replaced Juventus F.C.

The tournament was contested by 5 teams, the teams played 4 round-robin 90-minute matches. Each team allowed to use two players not under contract with the club. Only in the 1985 edition was attended by four clubs.

Finals

References

External links
 Mundialito de Clubs at Rec.Sport.Soccer Statistics Foundation.

Defunct Italian football friendly trophies
Recurring sporting events established in 1981
Recurring events disestablished in 1987
1981 establishments in Italy
1980–81 in Italian football
1982–83 in Italian football
1984–85 in Italian football
1986–87 in Italian football
1981 in Brazilian football
1983 in Brazilian football
1985 in Brazilian football
1981 in Uruguayan football
1983 in Uruguayan football
1985 in Uruguayan football
1985 in Argentine football
1980–81 in Dutch football
1986–87 in Spanish football
1986–87 in French football